Grief in Exile is the seventh solo album by the American folk musician Mariee Sioux, released on June 7, 2019 by Night Bloom Records.

Track listing

References

2019 albums
Mariee Sioux albums